A co-operative wholesale society, or CWS, is a form of co-operative federation (that is, a co-operative in which all the members are co-operatives), in this case, the members are usually consumer cooperatives. According to co-operative economist Charles Gide, the aim of a co-operative wholesale society is to arrange “bulk purchases, and, if possible, organise production.” In other words, a co-operative wholesale society is a form of federal co-operative through which consumers co-operatives can collectively purchase goods at wholesale prices, and in some cases collectively own factories or farms.

The best historical examples of this are the English CWS and the Scottish CWS, which are the predecessors of the 21st century Co-operative Group. Indeed, in Britain, the terms Co-operative Wholesale Society and CWS are used to refer to this specific organisation rather than the organisational form. However, the English CWS has inspired many imitations around the world (including, for example, the New South Wales Co-operative Wholesale Society who have also described themselves as co-operative wholesale societies.

Bibliographical history
 The Story of the C.W.S. (The Jubilee History of the Co-operative Wholesale Society 1863-1913 by Percy Redfern) viii, 439, [1] p.; tables & illustrations, includes lists of officials, and photographs of buildings and some officials. Includes graphs on thin paper relating to economic history from 1860 to 1912, by G. H. Wood.
 The New History of the C.W.S. by Percy Redfern. xiv, 624 p.; illustrated. London: J. M. Dent, 1938. "First published in October, 1938, on the completion of seventy-five years of the Co-operative Wholesale Society limited." "Note on documentary sources": pp. 527–530: "Biographical supplement": pp. [565]-589.

Co-operative federalism
Co-operative wholesale societies have been advocated by co-operative federalism, which is the school of thought in co-operative economics favouring consumer co-operative societies. The co-operative federalists have argued that consumers' co-operatives should form co-operative wholesale societies and that, through such arrangements, they should undertake purchasing farms or factories. They argued that profits (or surpluses) from these CWSes should be paid as dividends to the member co-operatives, rather than to their workers.

See also
 List of co-operative federations

References

External links
 The National Co-operative Archive holds records relating to the Co-operative Wholesale Society.
 

Cooperatives
Business models
Wholesalers of the United Kingdom